The Oceanside International Film Festival (OIFF) is an annual film festival based in Oceanside, a town in North County of San Diego. It was founded in 2009 by the Oceanside Cultural Foundation.

History 
Executive director Lou Niles curates the festival along with his wife, director Carly Starr Brullo-Niles.

The 11th annual festival was the first in person event since 2019. It ran from February 22-27, 2022. Prior to the COVID-19 pandemic, the festival was held annually in August each year. It was virtual in August 2020, followed up by a virtual "best of" festival in February 2021. This transition was to permanently move the annual festival to February.

Notable Films 
Attack of the Killer Tomatoes by Costa Dillon and Wildlike starring Bruce Greenwood screened in 2015.

American Satan by Ash Avildsen won Best Narrative Feature, Hush won Best Picture, Our Barrio won Best Picture - Audience Choice and The Black Ghiandola starring Johnny Depp screened in 2017.

Episode 11 of TNT'''s Animal Kingdom season 3, Jackpot directed by Shawn Hatosy, premiered in 2018. Daisy Belle screened the same year.

Friend of the World by Brian Patrick Butler premiered and The Power Agent was nominated for Best Actress in 2020. Leave 'em Laughing was nominated in four categories including Best Supporting Actor for Matthew Glave and won Best Art Design for Elsa Mickelsen.

The first opening night film in 2022 was Blue Crush starring Kate Bosworth. That same year, We All Die Alone'' by Jonathan Hammond was nominated in five categories and won Best Supporting Actress for Suzana Norberg.

Notable appearances 
Notable attendees include Lee Meriwether, TJ Storm, Shawn Hatosy, Carolina Guerra, Ben Robson, Kate Bosworth, Sanoe Lake, John Stockwell, Taylor Steele, Tony Alva and Joanna Cassidy. Lifetime Achievement Award winners include Saginaw Grant, Kathleen Quinlan and Rolly Crump.

References

External links 
 Official website
 

Annual events in California
Cinema of Southern California
Culture of San Diego
Film festivals in San Diego
Film festivals established in 2009
Oceanside, California
Recurring events established in 2009